Stanton Griffis (May 2, 1887 – August 29, 1974) was an American businessman and diplomat.

Born in Boston, he earned a bachelor's degree from Cornell University in 1910. Griffis began his business career in 1919 after serving the Army General Staff with the rank of captain during World War I. While with Hemphill, Noyes & Co., Griffis financed Adolf Kroch's acquisition of Brentano's in 1933. He also helped the Atlas Corporation manage Madison Square Garden. Griffis was named a trustee of Cornell in 1930 and led Paramount Pictures from 1935 to 1942. He became involved with diplomacy and non-governmental organizations during World War II, serving as special envoy to several western European nations from 1942 to 1943, and directing the Motion Picture Bureau, a division of the Office of War Information, between 1943 and 1944. In a subsequent two-month stint as diplomatic representative, Griffis tried to dissuade Swedish manufacturers of ball bearings from exporting to Germany. Upon his return to the United States, Griffis was named leader of the American Red Cross in the Asia-Pacific. For aiding the World War II war effort, he received the Medal for Merit and the Medal of Freedom.

Griffis was appointed the United States Ambassador to Poland in May 1947 by President Harry S. Truman. Griffis stepped down in April 1948 and was named ambassador to Egypt shortly thereafter, serving until March 1949. Truman named Griffis ambassador to Argentina later that year. He remained in that position until 1950, and succeeded chargé d'affaires Paul T. Culbertson as ambassador to Spain in 1951. Before leaving Spain in January 1952, Griffis was awarded the Knight of the Grand Cross of the Order of Charles III.

Family
Stanton Griffis was the second child born to William Elliot Griffis. He had an elder sister Lillian, and a younger brother John Elliot Griffis, a composer. Stanton Griffis' marriage to Dorothea Nixon began in 1912 and ended in 1937, after a divorce. His second marriage, to actress Whitney Bourne, was his shortest. Griffis married Elizabeth Blakemore in 1973. His son, Nixon Griffis, and daughter, Theodora Griffis Latouche, both worked for Hemphill, Noyes & Co. for a time. Theodora died of cancer at the age of 40, in 1956. Stanton Griffis died in 1974 of pneumonia while being treated for burns and smoke inhalation at Lenox Hill Hospital. After selling Brentano's to the Crowell-Collier Publishing Company, Nixon left his business career and became a conservationist. Nixon Griffis died in 1993, aged 76.

References

1887 births
1974 deaths
People from Boston
Cornell University alumni
Paramount Pictures executives
Ambassadors of the United States to Argentina
Ambassadors of the United States to Spain
Ambassadors of the United States to Poland
Ambassadors of the United States to Egypt
Recipients of the Medal of Freedom
Deaths from pneumonia in New York City
American Red Cross personnel
20th-century American diplomats
New York Rangers executives
American financiers
People of the United States Office of War Information